The Secret Key and Other Verses (1906) is the fourth collection of poems by Australian poet George Essex Evans. It was released in hardback by Angus and Robertson in 1906, and features the poems "The Women of the West", "Ode for Commonwealth Day", and "Loraine".

The collection consists of 61 poems from a variety of sources.  The poet notes in the Original edition: "Some of these verses are taken from Loraine; many others, including the title piece and " The Commonwealth Ode" have not previously appeared in book form. For permission to include such later verses the  author is indebted to the proprietors of THE BULLETIN, ARGUS, AGE, AUSTRALASIAN, SYDNEY MORNING HERALD, COURIER, QUEENSLANDER, TOOWOOMBA CHRONICLE, and DARLING DOWNS GAZETTE."

Contents

Critical reception
A reviewer in The Australian Town and Country Journal found: "This book contains about sixty pieces all in the best style of the poet, and of these the Commonwealth Ode (which was awarded the fifty guinea prize by the Commonwealth Government), and about twenty other poems have not hitherto appeared in book form. This book should determine George Essex Evans's place in Australian literature up to the present time, and though the writer believes that the poet's great work has yet to be done, there is in "The Secret Key and Other Verses" sufficient to enshrine him in the hearts of all lovers of literature, to say nothing of the lovers of Australian literature. Evans would prefer to be judged on the common plane of letters, for letters in the wider sense have no restricting ambit of parish or continent."

See also
 Full text of The Secret Key and Other Verses
 1906 in Australian literature
 1906 in poetry

References

Australian poetry collections
1906 poetry books
Angus & Robertson books